John Gaines Miller (November 29, 1812 – May 11, 1856) was a U.S. Representative from Missouri.

Born in Danville, Kentucky, Miller attended the common schools and was graduated from Centre College in Danville.
He studied law and was admitted to the bar in 1834.
He moved to Boonville, Missouri, in 1835.
He served as a member of the state house of representatives in 1840.

Miller was elected as a Whig to the Thirty-second and Thirty-third Congresses and reelected as an Opposition Party candidate to the Thirty-fourth Congress, and served from March 4, 1851, until his death near Marshall, Missouri, May 11, 1856.
He was interred in Mount Olive Cemetery, near Marshall, Missouri.

See also
List of United States Congress members who died in office (1790–1899)

References

1812 births
1856 deaths
Politicians from Danville, Kentucky
Missouri Oppositionists
Whig Party members of the United States House of Representatives from Missouri
Members of the Missouri House of Representatives
Opposition Party members of the United States House of Representatives from Missouri
Centre College alumni
19th-century American politicians
People from Marshall, Missouri